Pokrovka is a rural locality (a selo) in the Bezenchuksky District in the Samara Oblast, Russia. Population:

References

Rural localities in Samara Oblast